Szymon h. Gozdawa, also known as Simon was a twelfth century Bishop of Płock, Poland.

He was from the Gozdawa noble family and was appointed bishop in 1112 AD. Jan Długosz says of him that he was very devout and ruled the diocese for 21 years until he died in 1129. He was also mentioned by the historian Gallus Anonymus.

References

Bishops of Płock
Year of birth unknown
11th-century births
1129 deaths
12th-century Roman Catholic bishops in Poland